Gorin is a surname. In Slavic countries it is used only for males, while the feminine counterpart is Gorina. It may refer to 
Aleksandr Gorin (born 1981), Russian association football player
B. Gorin (1868–1925), pen name of Isaac Goido, Jewish Russian-American Yiddish writer, journalist, playwright
Betty Jane Gorin-Smith (born 1940), American historian
Brandon Gorin (born 1978), American football offensive tackle
Charlie Gorin (born 1928), Major League Baseball pitcher
Duino Gorin (born 1951), Italian association football player
Grigori Gorin (1940–2000), Soviet playwright 
Igor Gorin (1904–1982), Austrian baritone and music teacher
Jean Gorin (1899–1981), French painter and sculptor
Jean-Pierre Gorin (born 1943), French filmmaker
Julia Gorin, American conservative writer, humorist, and political commentator
Kex Gorin (1949–2007), British drummer
Michael B. Gorin, American ophthalmologist
Ted Gorin (1924–2013), Welsh footballer
Vladimir Gorin (born 1965), Russian Olympic basketball player

See also
Gorini